A fanion is a small flag used by the French military; the equivalent of an American guidon or British company colour. The name derives from the Italian word gonfanone, or gonfanon. They were often attached to a small staff which was placed in the muzzle of a rifle.

The regulation sizes were 50 cm x 40 cm for a battalion fanion, 40 x 30 for a company fanion, and 34 x 27 for a platoon fanion (the latter can also be a triangular pennant 30 x 40).

See also
Colours, standards and guidons

Notes

External link
 
 

Types of flags
Military of France